"Shake" is a Europop song written by the Peter Hartmann, Jan Langhoff and Linda Holmberg and recorded by the Dutch singer EliZe. The song was released as EliZe's first single from her debut album In Control, which was released in October 2006 in the Benelux. It was produced by Peter Hartmann and Jan Langhoff and was made "Dancesmash" by Radio 538. The single spent 5 weeks in the Dutch Top 40 and peaked at number 32.

Music video

Directed by Robert Brouwers, the music video for "Shake" was released prior to the single's commercial release. Shot in a discotheek in her home country The Netherlands, EliZe appears dancing with her background dancers, performing a sensual choreography. EliZe is sexy in the style of Britney Spears, while she keeps on dancing and singing throughout the video.

Review

Review by Artistopia Music:

Formats and track listings

"Shake" was released on October 18, 2004 in the Netherlands. On May 17, 2005, the CD single was released in the U.S. with the vinyl single appearing on May 23, 2005.

Dutch CD single

"Shake" [radio edit] – 3:15
"Shake" [extended edit] – 6:31
"Shake" [remix] – 3:55
"Shake" [club mix] – 7:43
"Shake" [karaoke version] - 3:30
"Shake" [enhanced video] – 3:13

US CD single
"Shake" [radio edit] – 3:14
"Shake" [remix] – 3:52
"Shake" [extended edit] – 6:29
"Shake" [club mix] – 7:42
"Shake" [karaoke version] – 3:28

US (promo) vinyl single
Side 1
"Shake" [extended edit] – 6:29
"Shake" [radio edit] – 3:14
Side 2
"Shake" [club mix] – 7:42
"Shake" [remix] – 3:52

Charts

Personnel

Track 3 & 4 (CD single) produced by Matina Productions.
Published by: T.G. Publishing/Mundo Music/Music Allstars.
Styling: Moon V., Paul Warmer, Tov Jewels, It Store (Laren), The Factory, Kiki Riki, Next Issue (Amstelveen), Hip (Amsterdam) & DS Fashion
Hairstyling & make-up:  Jedidjah Kuijten.
Photos: Priscilla Laurens.
Video director: Robert Brouwers.
Video location: PV Showservice.
Choreography: Angelique Versnel (who is best known for her role in Alice Deejay).
Mastering by: AR Digital Mastering.
Distributed in the Netherlands by BMG.

References

External links
"Shake" Lyrics.

EliZe songs
2004 singles
2004 songs
Spinnin' Records singles